Miss Havisham is a character in the Charles Dickens novel Great Expectations (1861). She is a wealthy spinster, once jilted at the altar, who insists on wearing her wedding dress for the rest of her life. She lives in a ruined mansion with her adopted daughter, Estella. Dickens describes her as looking like "the witch of the place". In the novel, she schemes to have the young orphan, Pip, fall in love with Estella, so that Estella can "break his heart."

Although she has often been portrayed in film versions as very elderly, Dickens's own notes indicate that she is only in her mid-thirties at the start of the novel. However, it is indicated in the novel that her long seclusion without sunlight has aged her. She is one of the most gothic characters in the work of Dickens.

Character history 

Miss Havisham's father was a wealthy brewer and her mother died shortly after she was born. Her father remarried and had an illegitimate son, Arthur, with the household cook. Miss Havisham's relationship with her half-brother was a strained one.  
She inherited most of her father's fortune and fell in love with a man named Compeyson, who conspired with the jealous Arthur to swindle her of her riches. Her cousin, Matthew Pocket, warned her to be careful, but she was too much in love to listen. On the wedding day, while she was dressing, Miss Havisham received a letter from Compeyson and realised he had defrauded her and she had been left at the altar.

Humiliated and heartbroken, Miss Havisham suffered a mental breakdown and remained alone in her decaying mansion Satis House – never removing her wedding dress, wearing only one shoe, leaving the wedding breakfast and cake uneaten on the table, and allowing only a few people to see her. She also had the clocks in her mansion stopped at twenty minutes to nine: the exact time when she had received Compeyson's letter.

Time passed and Miss Havisham had her lawyer, Mr. Jaggers, adopt a daughter for her.

From protection to revenge
While Miss Havisham's original goal was to prevent Estella from suffering as she had at the hands of a man, it changed as Estella grew older:

 While Estella was still a child, Miss Havisham began casting about for boys who could be a testing ground for Estella's education in breaking the hearts of men as vicarious revenge for Miss Havisham's pain. Pip, the narrator, is the eventual victim; and Miss Havisham readily dresses Estella in jewels to enhance her beauty and to exemplify all the more the vast social gulf between her and Pip. When, as a young adult, Estella leaves for France to receive education, Miss Havisham eagerly asks him, "Do you feel you have lost her?"

Repentance and death

Miss Havisham repents late in the novel when Estella leaves to marry Pip's rival, Bentley Drummle; and she realises that she has caused Pip's heart to be broken in the same manner as her own; rather than achieving any kind of personal revenge, she has only caused more pain. Miss Havisham begs Pip for forgiveness.

After Pip leaves, Miss Havisham's dress catches on fire from her fireplace. Pip rushes back in and saves her. However, she has suffered severe burns to the front of her torso (she is laid on her back), up to the throat. The last words she speaks in the novel are (in a delirium) to Pip, referencing both Estella and a note she, Miss Havisham, has given him with her signature: "Take the pencil and write under my name, 'I forgive her!'"

A surgeon dresses her burns, and says that they are "far from hopeless". However, despite rallying for a time, she dies a few weeks later, leaving Estella as her chief beneficiary, and a considerable sum to Herbert Pocket's father, as a result of Pip's reference.

Claimed prototypes
Eliza Emily Donnithorne (1821–1886) of Newtown, Sydney, was said to have been jilted by her groom on her wedding day and spent the rest of her life in a darkened house, her rotting wedding cake left as it was on the table, and with her front door kept permanently ajar in case her groom ever returned. She was widely considered at the time to be Dickens' model for Miss Havisham, although this cannot be proven.

In the 1965 Penguin edition, Angus Calder notes at Chapter 8 that "James Payn, a minor novelist, claimed to have given Dickens the idea for Miss Havisham – from a living original of his acquaintance. He declared that Dickens's account was 'not one whit exaggerated'." It is documented Dickens encountered a wealthy recluse called Elizabeth Parker on whom it is widely believed he based the character, whilst staying in Newport, Shropshire, at the aptly named Havisham Court.

Margaret Catherine Dick (1827—1879) of Bonchurch, Isle of Wight, was the daughter of Captain Samuel Dick, who lived in “Uppermount” Bonchurch. Dickens spent the summer of 1849  in Bonchurch writing chapters of David Copperfield, and based the character Mr Dick (who boarded with Miss Betsy Trotwood) on Margaret’s brother Charles George Dick who regularly walked with Dickens up St Boniface Down. Margaret Dick was jilted at the altar in 1860 and lived a reclusive life afterwards in Bonchurch. Dickens' daughters and estranged wife also visited Bonchurch in 1860, shortly after this event, and he may have based the character of Miss Havisham on Margaret Dick; another villager, Catherine Fane Haviland, could have been the clue to the name Miss Havisham.

Alternative and derived versions 
Miss Havisham's Fire (1979, revised 2001) is an opera composed by Dominick Argento with a libretto by John Olon-Scrymgeour, based on Dickens' character. The entire story is told in flashback during an inquiry into Miss Havisham's death. The opera gives her first name as "Aurelia".

Ronald Frame's 2013 novel, Havisham, is a non-canonical story about Miss Havisham's early life. The story tells how Miss Havisham (given the name of Catherine) is the daughter of a brewer. The story tells of more than just the infamous trauma of being left behind by her fiancé and goes on with her taking charge of her family's business before descending into vengeful madness, adopting Estella, and arranging the meeting of Estella and Pip.

Both Sunset Boulevard and What Ever Happened to Baby Jane? were inspired by David Lean's adaptation of Great Expectations, as were, by extension, the characters of Norma Desmond and Baby Jane Hudson, and their homes.

In film and television

In film adaptations of Great Expectations, Miss Havisham has been played by a number of actors, including:
Florence Reed (1934)
Martita Hunt (1946)
Margaret Leighton (1974)
Joan Hickson (1981)
Jean Simmons (who had previously played Estella in 1946 opposite Hunt) (1989)
Anne Bancroft (1998) (a version which modernised the story to the twentieth century and changed the names of several characters)
Charlotte Rampling (1999)
Gillian Anderson (2011, 3-part TV movie adaptation)
Helena Bonham Carter (2012) (in this version the character is given the  name "Eleanor" but no one addresses her by it)
Tuppence Middleton (2015) (in the multiplot TV series Dickensian; in this version the character is given the name "Amelia" and is referenced as such)
Tabu (2016) (in Fitoor, a Hindi version; as Begum Hazrat)
Olivia Colman (2023)

In science
The condition of the "Miss Havisham effect" has been coined by scientists to describe a person who suffers a painful longing for lost love, which can become a physically addictive pleasure by activation of reward and pleasure centres in the brain, which have been identified to regulate addictive behaviour – regions commonly known to be responsible for craving and drug, alcohol and gambling addiction.

References

External links

Female characters in film
Female characters in literature
Fictional English people
Fictional hermits
Great Expectations characters
Literary characters introduced in 1861
Newport, Shropshire